Martín Palacios Calderón (born 15 March 1972) is a Mexican politician from the Labor Party. In 2012 he served as Deputy of the LXI Legislature of the Mexican Congress representing the State of Mexico.

References

1972 births
Living people
Politicians from the State of Mexico
Labor Party (Mexico) politicians
21st-century Mexican politicians
Deputies of the LXI Legislature of Mexico
Members of the Chamber of Deputies (Mexico) for the State of Mexico